The mixed team sprint competition in cross-country skiing at the 2023 Winter World University Games was held on 13 January 2023, at the Lake Placid Olympic Sports Complex Cross Country Biathlon Center.

Results

Semifinals

Final

References

Mixed team sprint